Machulo La is a mountain view point in Central Karakoram National Park, Gilgit-Baltistan, Pakistan. It is considered the most easiest way to view some of the most highest peaks of Himalayas and Karakoram mountains in a single glance such as K2, Broad Peak, Gasherbrum-I, Gasherbrum-II, Gasherbrum III, Gasherbrum IV, K7, K6 and Nanga Parbat.

See also
Burji La

References

Mountain passes of Gilgit-Baltistan
Karakoram
Mountain view points
Outdoor structures in Pakistan